Joseph Colin Smith  (9 February 1931 - 28 October 2016), was a British urologist in Oxford. Earlier in his career, he assisted Alec Williams Badenoch in the prostate surgery on the then British Prime Minister, Harold Macmillan, at the King Edward VII's Hospital.

References

1931 births
2016 deaths
British urologists